Levan Strice is a   Local Nature Reserve in Wigmore in Kent. It consists mostly of woodland with public access trails. It is owned and managed by Medway Council. This site has ancient woodland; the main habitat is coppice woodland. There is access to the site from both Thanet Road (off Maidstone Road, Wigmore) and via a rear gate inside the car park at Wigmore Library.

The woodland area is bordered by urban development, although it is home to a spectrum of British fauna (including foxes and various birds) and flora. A large number of bluebells bloom in the spring months and make up a carpet of dense woodland floor, making it a popular bluebell wood walking route for families and locals.

References

Local Nature Reserves in Kent